Peterhead is a north-western suburb of Adelaide 15 km from the CBD, on the LeFevre Peninsula, in the state of South Australia, Australia and falls under the City of Port Adelaide Enfield. It is adjacent to Largs Bay and Birkenhead. The postcode for Peterhead is 5016. It is bounded to the north by Wills Street, to the south by Hargrave Street and in the west and east by the Outer Harbor railway line and the Port River respectively.

History 
Peterhead was laid out in August 1875 by William Diverall, the land broker of Port Adelaide on section 1099, Hundred of Port Adelaide. The name is from Scotland, Diverall's original homeland. Peterhead Post Office opened around 1886.

Facilities 
The suburb is not served by a primary school, the nearest is Le Fevre Primary School in Birkenhead, and the local high school is Le Fevre High School, in nearby Semaphore South. There is a small museum on Fletcher Road, and a scout hall on Wills Street. 
An On The Run service station and convenience store serves the suburb on Victoria Road, opposite Adelaide Brighton Cement.

The eastern side of the suburb, by the Port riverside is the location of the Adelaide Brighton Cement company, and a berth for the Shell oil company.

The Austbuilt Maritime Museum is located on Fletcher Road, Peterhead.

Transport 
The 150 bus services Fletcher Road. The suburb also is serviced by a train station on the Outer Harbor railway line, the Peterhead railway station, which is actually just south of the border in Birkenhead.

Governance
Peterhead is located in the federal division of Hindmarsh, the state electoral district of Port Adelaide and the local government area of the City of Port Adelaide Enfield.

References

Suburbs of Adelaide
Lefevre Peninsula